Linus Gerdemann (born 16 September 1982) is a German former professional road bicycle racer, who won a stage in the 2007 Tour de France and led the general classification for two days, wearing the yellow jersey.

After failing to find a contract for 2013, Gerdemann joined  for the 2014 season. In 2015 he rode for Danish professional continental team Cult Energy-Vital Water. Early 2017, Gerdemann announced his retirement.

Career

After riding on amateur teams Team Winfix and Team AKUD Arnolds Sicherheit, in 2005 he became a professional rider for  after a recommendation from Dennis Kraft, signing on for a 2-year contract. In his first year as a pro, he won the 7th stage of the UCI ProTour race Tour de Suisse and had the leader's jersey in Four Days of Dunkirk.

In late 2005 he agreed to a contract with rival UCI ProTour , starting from 2006. This got Team CSC owner Bjarne Riis to release Gerdemann from his contract at the end of 2005.

On Saturday 14 July 2007 he secured his biggest victory in his career, the seventh stage of the Tour de France from Bourg-en-Bresse to Le Grand-Bornand. The stage win gave him the yellow jersey as leader of the general classification, as well as the white jersey as leader of the young rider classification. He was also awarded the combativity award for this stage.

In March 2008 he sustained injuries from a crash in the Tirreno–Adriatico and was unable to race in the 2008 Tour de France or the Beijing summer Olympics. He came back from his injuries to win the Deutschland Tour in August 2008.

Gerdemann also won the Tour of Luxembourg in 2011 and 2015.

Major results

2003
 6th Overall Tour de Berlin
2004
 National Under-23 Road Championships
1st  Road race
3rd Time trial
 1st Stage 4 Tour de Berlin
 4th Memoriał Henryka Łasaka
 6th Overall Thüringen Rundfahrt der U23
 7th Rund um den Henninger Turm U23
2005
 1st Stage 7 Tour de Suisse
 2nd Overall Cinturón a Mallorca
 3rd Overall Bayern Rundfahrt
 5th Overall Four Days of Dunkirk
2006
 6th Overall Volta a Catalunya
 7th Overall Tour de Suisse
 7th Grand Prix of Aargau Canton
 8th Trofeo Calvià
2007
 Tour de France
1st Stage 7
Held  after Stages 7–8
 6th Gran Premio di Lugano
 9th Overall Vuelta a Andalucía
 9th Milano–Torino
2008
 1st  Overall Deutschland Tour
1st Stage 1
 1st  Overall Tour de l'Ain
1st Stage 3a
 1st Coppa Ugo Agostoni
 3rd Monte Paschi Eroica
 7th Overall Sachsen Tour
 9th Gran Premio di Lugano
2009
 1st  Overall Bayern Rundfahrt
 1st Großen Preis der Stadt Dessau-Roßlau
 5th Monte Paschi Strade Bianche
 7th Overall Tirreno–Adriatico
2010
 1st Trofeo Inca
 1st Stage 1 Tirreno–Adriatico
 9th Overall Vuelta a Andalucía
2011
 1st  Overall Tour de Luxembourg
1st Stage 2
 4th Overall Tour of Britain
 10th Overall Eneco Tour
2012
 2nd Road race, National Road Championships
 5th Overall Tour de Pologne
 8th Overall Vuelta a Castilla y León
2014
 Tour d'Azerbaïdjan
1st  Mountains classification
1st Stage 4
 5th Overall La Tropicale Amissa Bongo
2015
 1st  Overall Tour de Luxembourg
1st Stage 2
 4th Rund um Köln
 5th Gran Premio di Lugano
 8th Classica Corsica
2016
 10th Overall Vuelta a Castilla y León

References

External links

Palmares at Cycling Base (French)

1982 births
Living people
German male cyclists
German Tour de France stage winners
Sportspeople from Münster
Tour de Suisse stage winners
Cyclists from North Rhine-Westphalia